Ellen Deborah Ellis (1878 – 1974) was an American Professor of history and political science. She founded the political science department at Mount Holyoke College and was named its first chairman.

Biography
Ellen Deborah Ellis was born in Philadelphia, Pennsylvania, daughter of Henry D. Ellis and Ellen D. née Moore. She was educated in Philadelphia public schools before matriculating to Bryn Mawr College from the Philadelphia High School for Girls. During 1897–1898 she held the First Bryn Mawr Matriculation Scholarship for the Middle and Southern States, then the Philadelphia Girls' High and Normal Schools Alumnae Scholarship from 1897 to 1901. She graduated with an A.B. in 1901, then returned to attend graduate school at the same institution. She spent 1902–3 at the University of Leipzig as a Bryn Mawr College European fellow studying economics and history, and received an A.M. from Bryn Mawr College in 1903. During 1904–5 she was a resident fellow in economics and history at Bryn Mawr. Ellis was awarded a PhD from Bryn Mawr College with a dissertation titled, An Introduction to the History of Sugar as a Commodity.

Beginning in 1905, she was hired as an instructor of economics and political Science at Mount Holyoke College in Massachusetts. She became associate professor of history at the college in 1908, and was acting head of the department of history through 1912. During 1913–1914, she took a leave of absence to teach at Constantinople College in Turkey, where she served as head of the History Department. Returning to Mount Holyoke College, she was named professor of political science in 1919. In 1939, she founded the political science department at Mount Holyoke College and was named its first chairman. Ellis retired in 1944, but continued to teach at Holyoke Junior College. In the period 1946–47, she was acting librarian at Istanbul Women's College. During 1958–59 she would return to teach at Mount Holyoke College as Professor Emeritus. During her career she wrote a number of articles for different journals and magazines.

Bibliography
Her published works include:

Further reading

References

1878 births
1974 deaths
American women political scientists
American political scientists
American women academics
Mount Holyoke College faculty
Bryn Mawr College alumni
Educators from Philadelphia